In mathematics applied to computer science, Monge arrays, or Monge matrices, are mathematical objects named for their discoverer, the French mathematician Gaspard Monge.

An m-by-n matrix is said to be a Monge array if, for all  such that

one obtains

So for any two rows and two columns of a Monge array (a 2 × 2 sub-matrix) the four elements at the intersection points have the property that the sum of the upper-left and lower right elements (across the main diagonal) is less than or equal to the sum of the lower-left and upper-right elements (across the antidiagonal).

This matrix is a Monge array:

For example, take the intersection of rows 2 and 4 with columns 1 and 5.
The four elements are:

 17 + 7 = 24
 23 + 11 = 34

The sum of the upper-left and lower right elements is less than or equal to the sum of the lower-left and upper-right elements.

Properties
The above definition is equivalent to the statement

Any subarray produced by selecting certain rows and columns from an original Monge array will itself be a Monge array.
Any linear combination with non-negative coefficients of Monge arrays is itself a Monge array.
One interesting property of Monge arrays is that if you mark with a circle the leftmost minimum of each row, you will discover that your circles march downward to the right; that is to say, if , then  for all . Symmetrically, if you mark the uppermost minimum of each column, your circles will march rightwards and downwards. The row and column maxima march in the opposite direction: upwards to the right and downwards to the left.
The notion of weak Monge arrays has been proposed; a weak Monge array is a square n-by-n matrix which satisfies the Monge property  only for all .
Every Monge array is totally monotone, meaning that its row minima occur in a nondecreasing sequence of columns, and that the same property is true for every subarray. This property allows the row minima to be found quickly by using the SMAWK algorithm.
Monge matrix is just another name for submodular function of two discrete variables. Precisely, A is a Monge matrix if and only if A[i,j] is a submodular function of variables i,j.

Applications
A square Monge matrix which is also symmetric about its main diagonal is called a Supnick matrix (after Fred Supnick); this kind of matrix has applications to the traveling salesman problem (namely, that the problem admits of easy solutions when the distance matrix can be written as a Supnick matrix). Any linear combination of Supnick matrices is itself a Supnick matrix.

References 

 

Theoretical computer science